Sir Kenneth Mathieson Dalglish  (born 4 March 1951) is a Scottish former football player and manager. During his career, he made 338 appearances for Celtic and 515 for Liverpool, playing as a forward, and earned a record 102 full caps for the Scotland national team, scoring 30 goals, also a joint-record. Dalglish won the Ballon d'Or Silver Award in 1983, the PFA Players' Player of the Year in 1983, and the FWA Footballer of the Year in 1979 and 1983. In 2009, FourFourTwo magazine named Dalglish the greatest striker in post-war British football, and he has been inducted into both the Scottish and English Football Halls of Fame. He is very highly regarded by Liverpool fans, who still affectionately refer to him as King Kenny, and in 2006 voted him top of the fans' poll "100 Players Who Shook the Kop".

Dalglish began his career with Celtic in 1971, going on to win four Scottish league championships, four Scottish Cups and one Scottish League Cup with the club. In 1977, Liverpool manager Bob Paisley paid a British transfer record of £440,000 to bring Dalglish to Liverpool. His years at Liverpool were among the club's most successful periods, as he won six English league championships, the FA Cup, four League Cups, five FA Charity Shields, three European Cups and one European Super Cup. In international football, Dalglish made 102 appearances and scored 30 goals for Scotland between 1971 and 1986, becoming their most capped player and joint-leading goalscorer (with Denis Law).

Dalglish became player-manager of Liverpool in 1985 after the resignation of Joe Fagan, winning a further three First Divisions, two FA Cups and four FA Charity Shields, before resigning in 1991. Eight months later, Dalglish made a return to football management with Blackburn Rovers, whom he led from the Second Division to win the Premier League in 1995. Soon afterwards, he stepped down as manager to become Director of Football at the club, before leaving altogether in 1996. In January 1997, Dalglish took over as manager at Newcastle United. Newcastle finished as runners-up in the Premier League during his first season, but they only finished 13th in 1997–98, which led to his dismissal the following season. Dalglish went on to be appointed Director of Football at Celtic in 1999, and later manager, where he won the Scottish League Cup before an acrimonious departure the following year.

Between 2000 and 2010, Dalglish focused on charitable concerns, founding The Marina Dalglish Appeal with his wife to raise money for cancer care. In January 2011, Dalglish returned to Liverpool for a spell as caretaker manager after the dismissal of Roy Hodgson, becoming the permanent manager in May 2011. Despite winning the League Cup, which was the club's first trophy since 2006, earning them a place in the UEFA Europa League, and reaching the FA Cup Final, Liverpool only finished 8th in the Premier League, and Dalglish was dismissed in May 2012. In October 2013, Dalglish returned to Anfield as a non-executive director, and Anfield's Centenary Stand was renamed after him in May 2017.

Early life
The son of an engineer, Dalglish was born in Dalmarnock in the east end of Glasgow and was brought up in Milton in the north of the city. When he was 14 the family moved to a newly built tower block in Ibrox overlooking the home ground of Rangers, the club he had grown up supporting.

Dalglish attended Miltonbank Primary School in Milton and started out as a goalkeeper. He then attended High Possil Senior Secondary School, where he won the inter-schools five-a-side and the inter-year five-a-side competitions. He won the Scottish Cup playing for Glasgow Schoolboys and Glasgow Schools, and was then selected for the Scottish schoolboys team that went undefeated in a Home Nations Victory Shield tournament. In 1966, Dalglish had unsuccessful trials at West Ham United and Liverpool.

Club career

Celtic
Dalglish signed a professional contract with Celtic in May 1967. The club's assistant manager Sean Fallon went to see Dalglish and his parents at their home, which had Rangers-related pictures on the walls. In his first season, Dalglish was loaned out to Cumbernauld United, for whom he scored 37 goals. During this time he also worked as an apprentice joiner. Celtic manager Jock Stein wanted Dalglish to spend a second season at Cumbernauld, but the youngster wanted to turn professional. Dalglish got his wish and became a regular in the reserve team known as the Quality Street Gang, due to it containing a large number of highly rated players, including future Scottish internationals Danny McGrain, George Connelly, Lou Macari and David Hay. Dalglish made his first-team competitive debut for Celtic in a Scottish League Cup quarter-final tie against Hamilton Academical on 25 September 1968, coming on as a second-half substitute in a 4–2 win.

He spent the 1968–69 season playing for the reserves, though scored just four goals in 17 games. The following season he changed his position, moving into midfield, and enjoyed a good season as he helped the reserve team to the league and cup double, scoring 19 goals in 31 games. Stein put Dalglish in the starting XI for the first team in a league match against Raith Rovers on 4 October 1969. Celtic won 7–1 but Dalglish didn't score, nor did he score in the next three first-team games he played in during the 1969–70 season.

Dalglish continued his goalscoring form in the reserves into the next season, scoring 23 goals. A highlight of his season came in the Reserve Cup Final against Rangers; Dalglish scored one goal in a 4–1 win in the first leg, then in the second leg scored a hat-trick in a 6–1 win to clinch the cup. Still not a first-team regular, Dalglish was in the stands when the Ibrox disaster occurred at an Old Firm match in January 1971, when 66 Rangers fans died. On 17 May 1971, he played for Celtic against Kilmarnock in a testimonial match for the Rugby Park club's long serving midfielder Frank Beattie, and scored six goals in a 7–2 win for Celtic.

The 1971–72 season saw Dalglish finally establish himself in the Celtic first team,. He scored his first competitive goal for the first team on 14 August 1971, Celtic's second goal with a penalty kick in a 2–0 win over Rangers at Ibrox Stadium. He went on to score 29 goals in 53 games that season, including a hat-trick against Dundee and braces against Kilmarnock and Motherwell and helped Celtic win their seventh consecutive league title. Dalglish also played in Celtic's 6–1 win over Hibernian in the 1972 Scottish Cup Final. In 1972–73 Dalglish was Celtic's leading scorer, with 39 goals in all competitions, and the club won the league championship once again. Celtic won a league and cup double in 1973–74 and reached the semi-finals of the European Cup. The ties against Atlético Madrid were acrimonious, and Dalglish described the first leg in Glasgow where the Spanish side had three players sent off as "without doubt the worst game I have ever played in as far as violence is concerned." Dalglish won a further Scottish Cup winner's medal in 1975, providing the cross for Paul Wilson's opening goal in a 3–1 win over Airdrieonians in what transpired to be captain Billy McNeill's last match before retiring from playing football.

Dalglish was made Celtic captain in the 1975–76 season, during which the club failed to win a trophy for the first time in 12 years. Jock Stein had been badly injured in a car crash and missed most of that season while recovering from his injuries. Celtic won another league and cup double in 1976–77, with Dalglish scoring 27 goals in all competitions. On 10 August 1977, after making 320 appearances and scoring 167 goals for Celtic, Dalglish was signed by Liverpool manager Bob Paisley for a British transfer fee record of £440,000 (£ today). The deal was unpopular with the Celtic fans, and Dalglish was booed by the crowd when he returned to Celtic Park in August 1978 to play in a testimonial match for Stein.

Liverpool

Dalglish was signed to replace Kevin Keegan and quickly settled into his new club. He made his debut on 13 August 1977 in the season opener at Wembley, in the 1977 FA Charity Shield against Manchester United. He scored his first goal for Liverpool in his league debut a week later on 20 August, against Middlesbrough. Dalglish also scored three days later on his Anfield debut in a 2–0 victory over Newcastle United, and he scored Liverpool's sixth goal when they beat Keegan's Hamburg 6–0 in the second leg of the 1977 European Super Cup. By the end of his first season with Liverpool, Dalglish had played 62 times and scored 31 goals, including the winning goal in the 1978 European Cup Final at Wembley against Bruges.

In his second season, Dalglish recorded a personal best of 21 league goals for the club and was also named Football Writers' Association Footballer of the Year. He did not miss a league game for Liverpool until the 1980–81 season, when he appeared in 34 out of 42 league games and scored only eight goals as Liverpool finished fifth in the league, but still won the European Cup and Football League Cup. He recovered his goal-scoring form the following season, and was an ever-present player in the league once again, scoring 13 goals as Liverpool became league champions for the 13th time, and the third time since Dalglish's arrival. It was also around this time that he began to form a potent strike partnership with Ian Rush; Dalglish began to play just off Rush, "running riot in the extra space afforded to him in the hole". Dalglish was voted PFA Players' Player of the Year for the 1982–83 season, during which he scored 18 league goals as Liverpool retained their title. From 1983 Dalglish became less prolific as a goalscorer, though he remained a regular player.

After becoming player-manager on the retirement of Joe Fagan in the 1985 close season and in the aftermath of the Heysel Stadium disaster, Dalglish selected himself for just 21 First Division games in 1985–86 as Liverpool won the double, but he started the FA Cup final win over Everton. On the last day of the league season, his goal in a 1–0 away win over Chelsea gave Liverpool their 16th league title. Dalglish had a personally better campaign in the 1986–87 season, scoring six goals in 18 league appearances, but by then he was committed to giving younger players priority for a first-team place.

With the sale of Ian Rush to Juventus in 1987, Dalglish formed a new striker partnership of new signings John Aldridge and Peter Beardsley for the 1987–88 season, and he played only twice in a league campaign which saw Liverpool gain their 17th title. Dalglish did not play in Liverpool's 1988–89 campaign, and he made his final league appearance on 5 May 1990 as a substitute against Derby. At 39, he was one of the oldest players ever to play for Liverpool. His final goal had come three years earlier, in a 3–0 home league win over Nottingham Forest on 18 April 1987.

International career
Tommy Docherty gave Dalglish his debut for the Scottish national side as a substitute in the 1–0 Euro 1972 qualifier victory over Belgium on 10 November 1971 at Pittodrie. Dalglish scored his first goal for Scotland a year later on 15 November 1972 in the 2–0 World Cup qualifier win over Denmark at Hampden Park. Scotland would go on to qualify for the final tournament and he was part of Scotland's 1974 World Cup squad in West Germany. He started in all three games as Scotland were eliminated during the group stages despite not losing any of their three games.

In 1976, Dalglish scored the winning goal for Scotland at Hampden Park against England, by nutmegging Ray Clemence. A year later Dalglish scored against the same opponents and goalkeeper at Wembley, in another 2–1 win. Dalglish went on to play in both the 1978 World Cup in Argentina where he started in all of Scotland's games – scoring against eventual runners-up the Netherlands in a famous 3–2 win – and the 1982 World Cup in Spain, scoring against New Zealand. On both occasions Scotland failed to get past the group stage. Dalglish was selected for the 22-man squad travelling to Mexico for the 1986 World Cup, but had to withdraw due to injury.

In total, Dalglish played 102 times for Scotland (a national record) and he scored 30 goals (also a national record, which matched that set by Denis Law). His final appearance for Scotland, after 15 years as a full international, was on 12 November 1986 at Hampden Park in a Euro 1988 qualifying game against Luxembourg, which Scotland won 3–0. His 30th and final international goal had been two years earlier, on 14 November 1984, in a 3–1 win over Spain in a World Cup qualifier, also at Hampden Park.

Managerial career

Liverpool
After the Heysel Stadium disaster in 1985 and Joe Fagan's subsequent resignation as manager, Dalglish became player-manager of Liverpool. In his first season in charge in 1985–86, he guided the club to its first "double". Liverpool achieved this by winning the League Championship by two points over Everton (Dalglish himself scored the winner in a 1–0 victory over Chelsea at Stamford Bridge to secure the title on the final day of the season), and the FA Cup by beating Everton in the final.

The 1986–87 season was trophyless for Liverpool. They lost 2–1 to Arsenal in the League Cup final at Wembley. Before the 1987–88 season, Dalglish signed two new players: striker Peter Beardsley from Newcastle and winger John Barnes from Watford. He had already purchased goalscorer John Aldridge from Oxford United (a replacement for Ian Rush, who was moving to Italy) in the spring of 1987 and early into the new campaign, bought Oxford United midfielder Ray Houghton. The new-look Liverpool side shaped by Dalglish topped the league for almost the entire season, and had a run of 37 matches unbeaten in all competitions (including 29 in the league; 22 wins and 7 draws) from the beginning of the season to 21 February 1988, when they lost to Everton in the league. Liverpool were crowned champions with four games left to play, having suffered just two defeats from 40 games. However, Dalglish's side lost the 1988 FA Cup Final to underdogs Wimbledon.

In the summer of 1988, Dalglish re-signed Ian Rush. Liverpool beat Everton 3–2 after extra time in the second all-Merseyside FA Cup final in 1989, but was deprived of a second Double in the final game of the season, when Arsenal secured a last-minute goal to take the title from Liverpool. In the 1989–90 season Liverpool won their third league title under Dalglish. They missed out on the Double and a third successive FA Cup final appearance when they lost 4–3 in extra-time to Crystal Palace in an FA Cup semi-final at Villa Park. At the end of the season Dalglish received his third Manager of the Year award. Dalglish resigned as manager of Liverpool on 22 February 1991, two days after a 4–4 draw with rivals Everton in an FA Cup fifth round tie at Goodison Park, in which Liverpool surrendered the lead four times. At the time of his resignation, the club were three points ahead in the league and still in contention for the FA Cup.

Hillsborough disaster
Dalglish was the manager of Liverpool at the time of the Hillsborough disaster on 15 April 1989. The disaster claimed 94 lives on the day, with the final death toll reaching 97. Dalglish attended many funerals of the victims, including four in one day. His presence in the aftermath of the disaster has been described as "colossal and heroic". Dalglish broke a twenty-year silence about the disaster in March 2009, expressing regret that the police and the FA did not consider delaying the kick-off of the match. During the Hillsborough Memorial Service on 15 April 2011, Liverpool MP Steve Rotheram announced he would submit an Early Day Motion to have Dalglish knighted, "not only for his outstanding playing and managerial career, but also the charity work he has done with his wife, Marina, for breast cancer support and what he did after Hillsborough. It is common knowledge it affected him deeply".

Blackburn Rovers
Dalglish returned to management in October 1991 at Second Division Blackburn Rovers who had recently been purchased by multi-millionaire Jack Walker. By the turn of 1992 they were top of the Second Division, and then suffered a dip in form before recovering to qualify for the playoffs, during which Dalglish led Blackburn into the new Premier League by beating Leicester City 1–0 in the Second Division play-off final at Wembley. The resulting promotion meant that Blackburn were back in the top flight of English football for the first time since 1966. In the 1992 close season, Dalglish signed Southampton's Alan Shearer for a British record fee of £3.5 million. Despite a serious injury which ruled Shearer out for half the season, Dalglish achieved fourth position with the team in the first year of the new Premier League. The following year, Dalglish failed in an attempt to sign Roy Keane. Blackburn finished two positions higher the following season, as runners-up to Manchester United. By this time, Dalglish had added England internationals Tim Flowers and David Batty to his squad.

At the start of the 1994–95 season Dalglish paid a record £5 million for Chris Sutton, with whom Shearer formed an effective strike partnership. By the last game of the season, both Blackburn and Manchester United were in contention for the title. Blackburn had to travel to Liverpool, and Manchester United faced West Ham United in London. Blackburn lost 2–1, but still won the title since United failed to win in London. The title meant that Dalglish was only the fourth football manager in history to lead two different clubs to top-flight league championships in England, after Tom Watson, Herbert Chapman and Brian Clough. Dalglish became Director of Football at Blackburn in June 1995. He left the club at the start of the 1996–97 season after a disappointing campaign under his replacement, Ray Harford.

Following his departure from Blackburn Dalglish was appointed for a brief spell as an "international talent scout" at his boyhood club Rangers. He was reported as having played a central role in the signing of Chile international Sebastián Rozental.

Newcastle United
In January 1997, Dalglish was appointed manager of Premier League side Newcastle United on a three-and-a-half-year contract, taking over from Kevin Keegan. Dalglish guided the club from fourth position to a runner-up spot in May and a place in the new format of the following season's UEFA Champions League. He then broke up the team which had finished second two years running, selling popular players like Peter Beardsley, Lee Clark, Les Ferdinand and David Ginola and replacing them with ageing stars like John Barnes (34), Ian Rush (36) and Stuart Pearce (35), as well as virtual unknowns like Des Hamilton and Garry Brady. He also made some good long-term signings like Gary Speed and Shay Given. The 1997–98 campaign saw Newcastle finish in only 13th place and, despite Dalglish achieving some notable successes during the season (including a 3–2 UEFA Champions League win over Barcelona and an FA Cup final appearance against Arsenal), he was dismissed by Freddie Shepherd after two draws in the opening two games of the subsequent 1998–99 season, and replaced by former Chelsea manager Ruud Gullit. One commentator from The Independent has since written, "His 20 months at Newcastle United are the only part of Kenny Dalglish's career that came anywhere near failure".

Celtic
In June 1999 he was appointed director of football operations at Celtic, with his former Liverpool player John Barnes appointed as head coach. Barnes was dismissed in February 2000 and Dalglish took charge of the first team on an interim basis. He guided them to the Scottish League Cup final, where they beat Aberdeen 2–0 at Hampden Park. Dalglish was dismissed in June 2000, after the appointment of Martin O'Neill as manager. After a brief legal battle, Dalglish accepted a settlement of £600,000 from Celtic.

Return to Liverpool

In April 2009 Liverpool manager Rafael Benítez invited Dalglish to take up a role at the club's youth academy. The appointment was confirmed in July 2009, and Dalglish was also made the club's ambassador. Following Benítez's departure from Liverpool in June 2010, Dalglish was asked to help find a replacement, and in July Fulham's Roy Hodgson was appointed manager.

A poor run of results at the start of the 2010–11 season led to Liverpool fans calling for Dalglish's return as manager as early as October 2010, and with no subsequent improvement in Liverpool's results up to the end of the year (during which time the club was bought by New England Sports Ventures), Hodgson left Liverpool and Dalglish was appointed caretaker manager on 8 January 2011. Dalglish's first game in charge was on 9 January 2011 at Old Trafford against Manchester United in the 3rd round of the FA Cup, which Liverpool lost 1–0. Dalglish's first league game in charge was against Blackpool on 12 January 2011; Liverpool lost 2–1. After the game, Dalglish admitted that Liverpool faced "a big challenge".

Shortly after his appointment, Dalglish indicated he would like the job on a permanent basis if it was offered to him, and on 19 January the Liverpool chairman Tom Werner stated that the club's owners would favour this option. On 22 January 2011, Dalglish led Liverpool to their first win since his return, against Wolves at Molineux. After signing Andy Carroll from Newcastle for a British record transfer fee of £35 million and Luis Suárez from Ajax for £22.8 million at the end of January (in the wake of Fernando Torres's sale to Chelsea for £50 million), some journalists noted that Dalglish had begun to assert his authority at the club. Following a 1–0 victory against Chelsea at Stamford Bridge in February 2011, described by Alan Smith as "a quite brilliant display in terms of discipline and spirit" and a "defensive masterplan" by David Pleat, Henry Winter wrote, "it can only be a matter of time before he [Dalglish] is confirmed as long-term manager".

On 12 May 2011, Liverpool announced that Dalglish had been given a three-year contract. His first official match in charge was 2–0 defeat to Harry Redknapp's Spurs at Anfield. Dalglish's second stint in charge at Anfield proved controversial at times. The Scot defended Luis Suárez in the wake of the striker's eight-match ban for racially abusing Manchester United defender Patrice Evra when the teams met in October 2011. After the Uruguayan's apparent refusal to shake Evra's hand in the return fixture in February 2012, an apology from both player and manager came only after the intervention of the owners.

In February 2012, Dalglish led Liverpool to their first trophy in six years, with victory in the 2011–12 Football League Cup. In the same season he also led Liverpool to the 2012 FA Cup Final where they lost 2–1 to Chelsea. Despite the success in domestic cups, Liverpool finished eighth in the league, their worst showing in the league since 1994, failing to qualify for the Champions League for a third straight season. Following the end of the season, Liverpool dismissed Dalglish on 16 May 2012.

In October 2013, Dalglish returned to Liverpool as a non-executive director.

On 13 October 2017, Anfield's Centenary Stand was officially renamed the Sir Kenny Dalglish Stand in recognition of his unique contribution to the club.

Personal life

Dalglish has been married to Marina since 26 November 1974. The couple have four children, Kelly, Paul, Lynsey and Lauren. Kelly has worked as a football presenter for BBC Radio 5 Live and Sky Sports. Paul followed in his father's footsteps as a footballer, playing in the Premier League and Scottish Premiership before travelling to the United States to play for the Houston Dynamo in Major League Soccer. He retired in 2008 and became a coach, spending time as head coach of Ottawa Fury FC and Miami FC in the second-division leagues of North America. Dalglish's wife Marina was diagnosed with breast cancer in March 2003, but was treated at Aintree University Hospital in Liverpool and recovered. She later launched a charity to fund new cancer treatment equipment for UK hospitals.

Dalglish was appointed a Member of the Order of the British Empire (MBE) in the 1985 New Year Honours for services to football. He was appointed a Knight Bachelor in the 2018 Birthday Honours for services to football, charity and the City of Liverpool. He dedicated the award to former Celtic and Liverpool coaches Jock Stein, Bill Shankly and Bob Paisley stating that he was "Humbled" and "A wee bit embarrassed".

In 2002, Celtic supporters voted for what they considered to be the greatest Celtic XI of all time. Dalglish was voted into the team, which was; Simpson, McGrain, Gemmell, Murdoch, McNeill, Auld, Johnstone, P. McStay, Dalglish, Larsson and Lennox. He was an inaugural inductee to the English Football Hall of Fame the same year, and later also an inaugural inductee to the Scottish Football Hall of Fame in 2004. He is very highly regarded by Liverpool fans, who still affectionately refer to him as King Kenny, and in 2006 voted him top of the fans' poll "100 Players Who Shook the Kop". In 2009, FourFourTwo magazine named Dalglish the greatest striker in post-war British football.

In early April 2020, while in hospital for treatment for an unrelated condition, Dalglish was found to be positive for COVID-19, though asymptomatic.

Charitable work
In 2004, Dalglish and his wife founded the charity The Marina Dalglish Appeal to raise money to help treat cancer. Dalglish has participated in a number of events to raise money for the charity, including a replay of the 1986 FA Cup Final. In June 2007 a Centre for Oncology at Aintree University Hospital was opened, after the charity had raised £1.5 million. In 2012, the foundation made a £2 million donation to The Walton Centre which allowed the purchase of a new MRI scanner. Dalglish often competes in the annual Gary Player Invitational Tournament, a charity golfing event which raises money for children's causes around the world. On 1 July 2011, Dalglish was awarded an honorary degree by the University of Ulster, for services to football and charity.

Career statistics

Club

International

Managerial record

Honours

Player
Celtic
Scottish Division One/Premier Division: 1971–72, 1972–73, 1973–74, 1976–77
Scottish Cup: 1971–72, 1973–74, 1974–75, 1976–77
Scottish League Cup: 1974–75
Drybrough Cup: 1974–75
Glasgow Cup: 1974–75

Liverpool
Football League First Division: 1978–79, 1979–80, 1981–82, 1982–83, 1983–84, 1985–86
FA Cup: 1985–86
Football League Cup: 1980–81, 1981–82, 1982–83, 1983–84
FA Charity Shield: 1977 (shared), 1979, 1980, 1982, 1986 (shared)
European Cup: 1977–78, 1980–81, 1983–84
European Super Cup: 1977
Football League Super Cup: 1986

Scotland
British Home Championship: 1973–74, 1975–76, 1976–77

Individual
Scottish Premier Division Top-scorer: 1975–76 (24 goals) 
Ballon d'Or runner-up: 1983
PFA Players' Player of the Year: 1982–83
FWA Footballer of the Year: 1978–79, 1982–83
English Football Hall of Fame (Player): 2002
Scottish Football Hall of Fame: 2004
FIFA 100: 2004
BBC Goal of the Season: 1982–83
Bleacher Report's 21st Best Footballer Of All Time: 2011
Scotland's Greatest International Footballer: 2020

Manager
Liverpool
Football League First Division: 1985–86, 1987–88, 1989–90
FA Cup: 1985–86, 1988–89; runner-up 2011-12
Football League Cup: 2011–12
Football League Super Cup: 1985–86
FA Charity Shield: 1986 (shared), 1988, 1989, 1990 (shared)

Blackburn Rovers
Premier League: 1994–95
Football League Second Division play-offs: 1992

Celtic
Scottish League Cup: 1999–2000

Individual
FWA Tribute Award: 1987
Premier League Manager of the Season: 1994–95
Premier League Manager of the Month: January 1994, November 1994

Orders
Member of the Order of the British Empire: 1985
Knight Bachelor: 2018

See also
 List of men's footballers with 100 or more international caps
 List of English football championship winning managers
 List of Scotland national football team captains
 List of Scottish football families

References

Further reading

External links

 
 Official past players at Liverpool fc.tv
 English Football Hall of Fame Profile
 LFCHistory.net Player profile
 LFCHistory.net Manager profile
 ESPN Profile
 FIFA.com profile

1951 births
Living people
Footballers from Glasgow
Scottish footballers
Association football forwards
Cumbernauld United F.C. players
Celtic F.C. players
Liverpool F.C. players
Scottish Junior Football Association players
Scottish Football League players
English Football League players
Scottish league football top scorers
UEFA Champions League winning players
English Football Hall of Fame inductees
Scottish Football Hall of Fame inductees
Scotland under-23 international footballers
Scotland international footballers
1974 FIFA World Cup players
1978 FIFA World Cup players
1982 FIFA World Cup players
FIFA Century Club
FIFA 100
Association football player-managers
Scottish football managers
Liverpool F.C. managers
Blackburn Rovers F.C. managers
Newcastle United F.C. managers
Celtic F.C. managers
English Football League managers
Premier League managers
Scottish Premier League managers
Association football people awarded knighthoods
Knights Bachelor
Members of the Order of the British Empire
FA Cup Final players